Bloomfield Provincial Park is a provincial park and conservation area in Prince County, Canada. It opened in 1960.

References 

Provincial parks of Prince Edward Island
Parks in Prince County, Prince Edward Island